Jannick Rolland is the Brian J. Thompson Professor of Optical Engineering at the Institute of Optics at the University of Rochester. She is also the co-founder and CTO of LighTopTech, a women-owner business founded in 2013 to create medical imaging technologies with biomimetic noninvasive imaging technology. At the University of Rochester, she is the Director of the NSF I/UCRC Center for Freeform Optics (CeFO). She is also the Director of the R.E. Hopkins Center for Optical Design and Engineering that engages undergraduates in optical design, fabrication, and metrology.

Biography 
Originally from France, Rolland earned her undergraduate degree from the Institut D'Optique Graduate School (Supoptique) in 1984. She then moved to the United States where she completed her MS (1985) and Ph.D. (1990) degrees in optical science from the University of Arizona.

Rolland completed her postdoctoral fellowship in the Department of Computer Science at the University of North Carolina at Chapel Hill, where she focused on learning vision and computer graphics while designing stereoscopic head-worn displays for medical visualization. She then served there as Research Assistant Professor and Head of the Vision Group Computer Science. Before joining the Institute of Optics at the University of Rochester in 2009 she was a Professor of Optics, CREOL, the College of Optics and Photonics, University of Central Florida (UCF).

In 2016, Jannick collaborated with the OSA Foundation to honor her late-husband, Dr. Kevin P. Thompson (Group Director, Research and Development/Optics at Synopsys, Inc.) by endowing the Kevin P. Thompson Optical Design Innovator Award. This award is given annually to inspire the next generation of innovators by recognizing significant contributions in lens design, optical engineering, or metrology by an individual researcher at an early stage of their career.

Professor Rolland served on the editorial board of the Journal Presence (MIT Press) (1996-2006), associate editor of Optical Engineering (1999-2004), and is currently associate editor of Optics Letters. She is a fellow of the Optical Society of America, SPIE, and NYSTAR, and a recipient of the 2014 OSA David Richardson Medal and the 2017 Edmund A. Hajim Outstanding Faculty Award.

Awards and honors 

 2020, Joseph Fraunhofer Award/ Robert M. Burley Prize, The Optical Society "For numerous creative and innovative applications in several fields of optical engineering including Astronomy, Medical Imaging, Augmented & Virtual Reality, Image Science, and Freeform Optics." 
 2019, Alumnus of the Year, Wyant College of Optical Sciences, The University of Arizona.
 2017, Outstanding Faculty Award, Edmund A. Hajim Outstanding Faculty Award, University of Rochester.
 2014, David Richardson Medal, The Optical Society for “For visionary contributions and leadership in optical design and engineering, enabling noninvasive, optical biopsy”.
 2008, Fellow of SPIE.
 2004, Fellow of the Optical Society of America for “For contributions to image quality assessment techniques for medical imaging and for optics in virtual environments.”

Selected publications 
 Aaron Bauer, Eric M. Schiesser & Jannick P. Rolland (2018). “Starting geometry creation and design method for freeform optics” Nature Communications volume 9, Article number: 1756.
 Kevin P. Thompson, Pablo Benítez, and Jannick P. Rolland, "Freeform Optical Surfaces: Report from OSA’s First Incubator Meeting," Optics & Photonics News 23(9), 32-37 (2012).

Patents 

 Freeform nanostructured surface for virtual and augmented reality near eye display 
 Cascade Fourier domain optical coherence tomography 
 Freeform nanostructure surface for virtual and augmented reality near eye display 
 Systems and methods for performing Gabor-domain optical coherence microscopy 
 Dynamically focused optical instrument 
 Systems and methods for generating a tunable laser beam 
 Dynamically focused optical instrument 
 Systems and methods for providing compact illumination in head mounted displays 
 Systems and methods for generating a tunable laser beam 
 Compact optical see-through head-mounted display with occlusion support 
 Systems and methods for performing Gabor-domain optical coherence microscopy 
 Hybrid display systems and methods 
 Systems and methods for designing optical surfaces 
 Dynamic focus optical probes 
 Differential shack-hartmann curvature sensor 
 Imaging systems for eyeglass-based display devices 
 Systems and methods for evaluating vessels 
 Systems and methods for simulation of organ dynamics 
 Differential Shack-Hartmann curvature sensor 
 Support structure for head-mounted optical devices 
 Head mounted display with eyetracking capability 
 Automatic motion modeling of rigid bodies using collision detection 
 Compact lens assembly for the teleportal augmented reality system 
 Compact lens assembly for the teleportal augmented reality system 
 Compact microlenslet arrays imager 
 Mobile face capture and image processing system and method 
 Head-mounted display by integration of phase-conjugate material 
 Head-mounted display by integration of phase-conjugate material 
 Head mounted projection display with a wide field of view 
 Optical probes for imaging narrow vessels or lumens 
 Systems and methods for simulation of organ dynamics 
 Imaging systems for eyeglass-based display devices 
 Systems and methods for performing simultaneous tomography and spectroscopy 
 Systems and methods for providing compact illumination in head mounted displays

References

External links 
 Jannick Rolland can be seen discussing what excites her about work in this video.
 Read Etendue: Jannick P. Rolland-Thomson interview by the University of Arizona Alumni Wyant College of Optical Sciences.

Year of birth missing (living people)
Living people
Fellows of Optica (society)
21st-century women engineers
French women engineers
Optical engineers
University of Arizona alumni
University of Rochester faculty
French emigrants to the United States
Women in optics